Frank Patricio Carilao Pinto (born February 21, 1977) is a former Chilean footballer.

Titles

Club
Unión La Calera
 Tercera División de Chile (1): 2000

Deportes Iquique
 Copa Chile: 2010
 Primera B: 2010

References
 
 

1977 births
Living people
Footballers from Santiago
Chilean footballers
Chilean people of Mapuche descent
Indigenous sportspeople of the Americas
Chilean Primera División players
Primera B de Chile players
Santiago Wanderers footballers
Everton de Viña del Mar footballers
Unión Temuco footballers
Deportes La Serena footballers
Deportes Iquique footballers
San Marcos de Arica footballers
Association football defenders
Mapuche sportspeople